Heavenly Waters is either:

 A family of constellations; see Heavenly Waters (astronomy); or
 A song from the album The Decline of British Sea Power.